The 2000 Champion Hurdle was a horse race held at Cheltenham Racecourse on Tuesday 14 March 2000. It was the 71st running of the Champion Hurdle.

The winner for the third consecutive year was J. P. McManus's Istabraq, an eight-year-old gelding trained in Ireland by Aidan O'Brien and ridden by Charlie Swan. Istabraq became the fifth horse to win three Champion Hurdles after Hatton's Grace, Sir Ken, Persian War and See You Then.

Istabraq started the 8/15 favourite and won by four lengths from the French challenger Hors La Loi III, with Blue Royal a neck away in third. Apart from Istabraq, the only previous winner of the race to run was Make A Stand who finished last. Eleven of the twelve runners completed the course.

Race details
 Sponsor: Smurfit
 Purse: £250,000; First prize: £145,000
 Going: Good
 Distance: 2 miles 110 yards
 Number of runners: 12
 Winner's time: 3m 48.10

Full result

 Abbreviations: nse = nose; nk = neck; hd = head; dist = distance; UR = unseated rider; PU = pulled up; LFT = left at start; SU = slipped up

Winner's details
Further details of the winner, Istabraq
 Sex: Gelding
 Foaled: 23 May 1992
 Country: Ireland
 Sire: Sadler's Wells; Dam: Betty's Secret (Secretariat)
 Owner: J. P. McManus
 Breeder: Shadwell Stud

References

Champion Hurdle
 2000
Champion Hurdle
Champion Hurdle
2000s in Gloucestershire